Marcin Meller (born 23 October 1968) is a Polish historian, journalist and editor-in-chief of the Polish edition of Playboy magazine. Former member of the Independent Students' Union.

He was born on 23 October 1968 in Warsaw as a son of Polish diplomat and academician Stefan Meller. His grandfather, Adam Meller, was Polish-Jewish communist politician. Marcin Meller graduated in history at University of Warsaw in 1991, and then debuted as reporter in the Polityka magazine. At present, Meller is columnist in the Wprost magazine. He is also known for presenting in the TVN television.

References 

1968 births
Living people
University of Warsaw alumni
Polish atheists
Polish male non-fiction writers
Polish journalists
Polish people of Jewish descent